Nolima dine is a species of mantidfly in the family Mantispidae.

References

Further reading

 
 

Hemerobiiformia
Articles created by Qbugbot
Insects described in 1939